Eulenburg is a German surname. Notable people with the surname include:

Albert Eulenburg (1840–1917), German neurologist
Botho zu Eulenburg (1831–1912), Prussian statesman
August zu Eulenburg (1838–1921), Marshal of the Royal Court of Prussia
Friedrich Albrecht zu Eulenburg (1815–1881),  Prussian diplomat and politician
Hedda Eulenberg (1876–1960), German translator
Herbert Eulenberg (1876–1949), German writer
Botho Sigwart zu Eulenburg (1884–1915), German composer
Friedrich Wend zu Eulenburg (1881–1963), German prince and landowner
Philipp, Prince of Eulenburg (1847–1921), German diplomat and friend of Wilhelm II, German Emperor

German-language surnames